is a Japanese actress and television presenter.

Early career 
She attended Kokubunji High School in Tokyo, and Gakushuin University. Her resume includes Tokyo Disney Resort advertising, shown widely when the park opened.

Personal life 
Her parents divorced. She was married to Akihiko Matsumoto, a television music composer, and they have a daughter. In 2018 she released a cookbook of recipes she developed during breast cancer treatment and her subsequent study at a school of medicine.

TV programs 
 Waratte Iitomo
 Mecha-Mecha Iketeru!

References

External links 
 Lecturer

Japanese actresses
Gakushuin University alumni
1962 births
Living people